Events in the year 1908 in Venezuela

Incumbents
President: Cipriano Castro until December 19, Juan Vincente Gomez

Events
November 26-December 23: Dutch-Venezuela War
December 19: Coup d'état led by Juan Vicente Gómez

Births

Deaths

References

 
1900s in Venezuela
Years of the 20th century in Venezuela
Venezuela
Venezuela